Stainmore Summit is the highest point on the trans-Pennine South Durham & Lancashire Union Railway, also known as the Stainmore Railway in Northern England. Located on Stainmore between Barras and Bowes stations, the railway over the summit was the highest in England at  until its closure in 1962. The location was marked by a famous cast-iron sign which is now preserved at the Darlington Railway Centre and Museum. 

Whilst there wasn't a station at Stainmore, trains did halt here to let relatives of the railway workers on and off the trains to enable them to get transported off the summit. The railway had several cottages at the summit.

This pass is commonly referred to by geographers as the Stainmore Gap.

References

External links 
 Photographs of the summit railway
 Map showing location
 
 Newspaper article about the summit railway

South Durham and Lancashire Union Railway
Rail transport in Cumbria
Mountains under 1000 metres
Mountains and hills of the Pennines
Eden District